Piriyadha Varam Vendum is a 2001 Indian Tamil-language romantic comedy film written and directed by Kamal. It is a remake of his 1999 Malayalam film Niram. The movie stars Prashanth with Shalini and Jomol (Both reprising their roles from the original film), while an ensemble cast featuring Manivannan and Janagaraj among others play supporting roles. Featuring music composed by S. A. Rajkumar, the film had an average box office run. This was Shalini's final Tamil film.

Plot
Sanjay and Nithi are best friends right from their childhood days. They are neighbours, have grown up together, attend the same college, and spend every minute of their waking hours together. Both have admirers in college with Sneha wooing Sanjay and Praveen revealing his love for Nithi. Nithi's week-long trip to Bangalore, along with some prodding by his housemaid, makes Sanjay realize how much he misses Nithi and that he is in love with her. But respect for their friendship and her makes him hide his feelings. Meanwhile, Nithi accepts Praveen's proposal and things quickly move towards their marriage. But when things come together, Nithi realizes that she cannot stay without Sanjay, and at that time he reveals that he too loves her too.

Cast

 Prashanth as Sanjay
 Shalini as  Nithi
 Jomol as Sneha
 Krishna as Praveen
 Manivannan  as Dhanasekaran
 Nizhalgal Ravi as Vishwanathan
 Ambika as Nithi's mother
 Ashwini as Pushpa
 Manorama as Azhagi
 Kovai Sarala as Kannatha
 Dhamu as Sanjay's friend
 Janagaraj as Kannatha's neighbour
 Charle as Sanjay's friend
 Vaiyapuri as Sanjay's friend
 Balaji as Sanjay's friend
 Mink Brar in an item number

Production
Following the success of the 1999 Malayalam film Niram starring Kunchacko Boban and Shalini, the film's director Kamal chose to make his debut in Tamil films by remaking the film. Initially titled Kadhal Neethana, he signed up Prashanth to play the lead role while Shalini retained the leading female role after agreeing to work on it on stage at the success function of Niram. The makers approached Devayani to play a second lead role, but she turned down the offer. Sneha and newcomer Krishna were then signed up to play the second leads for the film, while it was reported that Khushbu would also play a pivotal role. Sneha was later replaced by Jomol, who had played the role in the original version of the film and Kushboo did not feature. Delays in production due to the producer's financial problems meant that the dates of the lead pair went awry and they were unable to combine to finish the shoot quickly. Prashanth chose to prioritise making his other film Appu as he had to sport a beard and thus Shalini was left waiting, although she had stated that she would not act again after her impending marriage. Shalini subsequently married actor Ajith Kumar and the actor was unwilling to let his wife rejoin the team stating that they had misused her dates. The team considered releasing the film in October 2000 using Shalini's scenes from the Malayalam version, while using graphics to edit out Kunchacko Boban and place in Prashanth, before Shalini readily agreed to feature. It subsequently became her final film before retirement.

Retitled as Piriyadha Varam Vendum, the film continued shoot in late 2000 with sequences including a song being filmed in Kochi with Mink Brar making a guest appearance. Owing to the earlier date problems, the team had shot the song "Vasco Da Gama" with guest dancer Raghava Lawrence but Prashanth was not pleased about the sudden change of cast in the song and requested to re-shoot it at his own cost. The song was financed by Murali Manohar while Prashanth's father Thiagarajan supervised the production of the song, which was guest directed by R. Madhesh and shot by Priyan, who had all volunteered.

Release
The film's production delays had constantly led to the release being postponed from dates ranging from September 2000 til February 2001 and it consequently had an average run at the box office. A critic noted "it is a fairly well-told, engaging story of best friends becoming lovers, though one realises this much before the other."

Soundtrack

The film score and the soundtrack were composed by S. A. Rajkumar. The soundtrack, released on 2 January 2001, features 5 tracks.

References

External links
 

2001 films
2000s buddy comedy films
2001 romantic comedy films
Tamil remakes of Malayalam films
2000s Tamil-language films
Indian buddy comedy films
Indian romantic comedy films
Films scored by S. A. Rajkumar
Films directed by Kamal (director)